( t'alch'um) could be characterized as a Korean dance performed while wearing a mask, mimicry, miming, speaking, and even sometimes singing. Although the term  is usually taken to mean all mask dance dramas by most Koreans, it is strictly speaking a regional term originally only applied to dances of Hwanghae Province in present-day North Korea. However,  is nowadays accepted as a general term for mask dance drama.

Korean mask dance dramas are not just dances performed by masked dancers but also include significant dramatic content, with masked characters portraying people, animals, and sometimes supernatural beings. These folk dramas reflect the frustrations felt by the lower classes towards the Confucian-literative Yangban, due to the latter's treatment of the commoners. They showcase the life of the common person and process social problems, such as monks who ignore their precepts and men who cast off their old wives.

History
 originated in Korean villages as part of shamanic rituals that had evolved to cleanse houses and villages, offer protection and good harvest.  It then became a form of popular entertainment.  It was once performed at the court – during the Goryeo, the Office of Masked-Dance Drama supervised such dances, and these dances may be performed at royal banquets.  The office however was abolished during the Joseon.

Themes and characteristics
Mask dance dramas share fundamental characteristics, even though they vary considerably according to region and performer.  Their basic themes are exorcism rites, ritual dances, biting satire, parody of human weaknesses, social evils and the privileged class. They appeal to the audiences by ridiculing apostate Buddhist monks, decadent upper-class men, and shamans. Another popular theme is the conflict between an old wife and a seductive concubine. With regional variations, the mask dance drama was generally performed on the First Full Moon, Buddha's Birthday on the Eighth of the Fourth Moon, Dano Festival and Chuseok. Variations may have been performed at festive state occasions or at rituals to supplicate for rain. The enthusiastic participation of the audience is the most remarkable feature of Korean mask dance drama. There is little distinction between the actors and the audience toward the end of a performance, as they join in robust dance and bring it to a finale.

Procedure
Mask dance is largely divided into seven parts.

The first chief's dance is a ritualistic dance about the four gods (사신도), meaning 'to drive out demons'.

The second section consists of eight monk dances, which are the first and second beopgonori. The evil monk dance shows itself decayed, introducing itself to the editorial and dance, respectively. The  tells a joke about a man and a woman taking off their clothes with a law school in their neck. Recently,  has disappeared.

The third section is a Sadang dance performed by seven masters, and appears in a shrine decorated with splendor. When a widower is kicked out of the shrine for mocking, seven of them sing a playful song.

The fourth section is a veteran dance. The dance shows the satire of a Buddhist monk who was praised as a living Buddha by Somu, a pub girl, or a concubine.

The fifth section is a lion sent by the Buddha to punish them for losing a lion dance. They try to eat their food and then they listen to the repentance and forgive and dance together.

Through the game of selecting a new residence, Sijojigi ('make a poem'), Paja Nori (make a poem with divided or combine Hanja), and catching  ('a person who embezzled public funds').

The seventh section meets Young-gam ('old man or a low-ranking official') and Mi-Yal-Hal-mi, who had been separated during a tumultuous dance, and they were quarreled because of the concubine's house, which he brought to them, and Mi-Yal was beaten to death by the Young-gam. An old man named Namgang appears and calls a shaman to perform a  rite. Showing the perils of working-class life and the tyranny of men over women due to polygamy, the last performance shows that the origin of mask dance is in the gut (a ritual performance in Korea).

Place of performance
A suitable place for performance is where a large audience can gather. The audience looks around the stage almost in a circle, but there is nothing on the stage, and only one side of the stage is a house called the Gaebok-cheong where performers change their masks and clothes. Although the stage is a flat floor that is as high as the stands, Bongsan Talchum also makes the stands higher. The reason is for merchants to sell food instead of admission to audience in the attic.

Styles
Mask dance dramas have been transmitted from all parts of the country. There are about thirteen different types of mask dance drama in Korea ― Hwanghaedo province's Haeseo style, such as Bongsan Talchum, Gangnyeong Talchum, Eunyul Talchum; Gyeonggi-do province's Yangju Byeolsandae, Songpa Sandae Noli Mask Dances; Gyeongsangnam-do province's Suyeong Yayu, Dongnae Yayu, Gasan Ogwangdae, Tongyeong Ogwandae, Goseong Ogwangdae; Gyeongsangbukdo province's Hahoe byeolsingut talnori; Gangwon province's Gangneung Gwanno Gamyeon'guk mask dance; and the Namsadang (male itinerant entertaining troupe of the Northern Line) Deotboegichum mask dance. Among those, Bongsan Talchum and Hahoe byeolsingut talnori are best known today.

Imaginary creatures in Talchum



A monster that eats bad yangbans. In some plays, if this type of creature eats 100 , they can go up to heaven.



They have a monster's head on top of a human body.



Water spirits. They are very fat, play instruments, and have seaweed all over their bodies. They may also be associated with fertility.

In Gangneung Gwanno Gamyeon'geuk, they are associated with fertility and the summer transplanting season, dancing, wearing clothes that bear the color of tilled earth, and decorated in rice seedlings as well as seaweed.



Juji are strange beings. They look like birds with very small heads or can have heads like those of lions. Two couples jump all around. The dances between the couples may symbolize fertility. However, the dance between the two lions could also indicate scaring away evil spirits.

Gallery

Notes

References
 Chae, Heewan. “The idea of Talchum.” Seoul: Hyunamsa, 1984
 "What is mask." Hahoe Mask Museum retrieved 29 June 2008
 Kim, Joo-yeon. "Talchum: Korean masked dance." The KNU times, 1 November 2006
 Kim, Ukdong. "The aesthetics of Talchum."  Seoul: Hyunamsa, 1999
 "Korean Mask Dance Drama: Talchum."  The magazine of Santa Clarita retrieved 29 June 2008
 "Mask Dances." Asian Studies presents Windows on Asia, retrieved 29 June 2008
 "Mask and Dance." Korean cultural Services NY, retrieved 25 June 2008
 "Talchum." Digital Choseonilbo retrieved 29 June 2008
 "Talchum.", retrieved 29 June 2008
 "The Nature and Origin of Masked Dance Drama." Hangukgwan, retrieved 29 June 2008

External links
 Talchum - Official Seoul City Tourism
 http://www.culturecontent.com
 'Talchum' Photographic Series by Charles Fréger

Korean dance
Masked dances
Masquerade ceremonies in Asia